Castelsarrasin is a commune in the Tarn-et-Garonne department in Occitanie region of France. The inhabitants are called Castelsarrasinois. It is the second most populous commune in Tarn-et-Garonne after Montauban.  It is served by Castelsarrasin station on the Bordeaux-Toulouse line.

History
The first certain evidence of the town dates from 961. The name, Castel Sarracenum, would indicate that the castle was built in the Saracen era. The early history of the city is marked by wars; against the English until the end of the 12th century, then the Albigensian Crusade during the first part of the 13th century, and then the Shepherd's Crusade of 1320 that resulted in the deaths of many Jews in the city. The region was much affected by the Hundred Years' War, and again, during the wars of religion of the 16th century, the city's largely Catholic population was in frequent conflict with the generally Protestant surrounding region.

The region is calmer during the following centuries, up to the time of the French Revolution.

Castelsarrasin was the finish of Stage 17 in the 2007 Tour de France.

Population

Personalities
 Antoine de la Mothe Cadillac, explorer and mayor, died in 1730.
 Charles de Mazade, born in 1820.
 Pierre Perret, singer born on 9 July 1934. 
 Caroline Costa, singer born in 1996

Monuments
 Église Saint-Sauveur, dating from the 13th century.

Administration
Castelsarrasin is the sub-prefecture of the department.

Bernard Dagen, pharmacist by profession, was mayor between 1989 and 2014.

See also
 Communes of the Tarn-et-Garonne department

References

External links
 Castelsarrasin official site  
 Castelsarrasin non official site since 2001 (in French)

Communes of Tarn-et-Garonne
Subprefectures in France
Languedoc